Johnny Beecher (born April 5, 2001) is an American ice hockey forward for the Providence Bruins of the American Hockey League (AHL) as a prospect to the Boston Bruins of the National Hockey League (NHL). He was drafted 30th overall by the Bruins in the first round of the 2019 NHL Entry Draft. He played college ice hockey for the Michigan Wolverines men's ice hockey team from 2019 to 2022.

Early life
Beecher was born on April 5, 2001, in Elmira, New York to parents Bill and Natasha. Although his parents were collegiate athletes, they did not play ice hockey. His father played lacrosse and golf at Elmira College while his mother ran track and cross-country at Union College. Beecher began ice skating when he was six years old after spending the summer playing roller hockey and immediately made the local travel team. Beyond ice hockey, Beecher also played soccer, football, baseball, and lacrosse. Beecher and his older brother Bryce played together until 2015 when his brother had to get his hips replaced due to him being born with congenital hip dysplasia.

Playing career
Beecher began his collegiate career at the University of Michigan during the 2019–20 season. During his three seasons at Michigan, he recorded 19 goals and 20 assists in 81 games for the Wolverines.

On April 13, 2022, Beecher signed an amateur tryout contract with the Bruins' AHL affiliate, the Providence Bruins, for the remainder of the 2021–22 season. He contributed with 5 points through the remaining 9 regular season games, and made 2 post-season appearances with 1 point for Providence.

On May 16, 2022, Beecher was signed to a three-year, entry-level deal with the Boston Bruins.

Career statistics

Regular season and playoffs

International

Awards and honors

References

External links

2001 births
Living people
American men's ice hockey centers
Boston Bruins draft picks
Ice hockey players from New York (state)
Michigan Wolverines men's ice hockey players
National Hockey League first-round draft picks
People from Elmira, New York
Providence Bruins players
USA Hockey National Team Development Program players